Friedrich Bachmann (born 11 February 1909 in Wernigerode, died 1 October 1982 in Kiel.) was a German mathematician who specialised in geometry and group theory.

Life
Bachmann was the son of a Lutheran minister Hans Bachmann. Bachmann came from an intellectual family, his paternal grandfather was the number theorist Paul Gustav Heinrich Bachmann. Bachmann took his early education at the Gymnasium in Münster. After attending the Gymnasium, he attended the University of Münster and the Humboldt University of Berlin and graduated in 1927. While there he was a member of the Münster Wingolfs.

In 1933, Bachmann was promoted to D.Phil with a thesis titled, Studies on the foundation of arithmetic with special reference to Dedekind, Frege, and Russell. His advisor was Heinrich Scholz.

His doctoral students include Andreas Dress and Rolf Lingenberg.

Bachmann  was married to a great-granddaughter of Otto von Bismarck, Alexandra von Bredow. They had a son together, Sebastian

Career
In 1935, Bachmann moved to the University of Marburg where assisted Kurt Reidemeister. Bachman habilitated at Marburg before becoming a  Privatdozent in 1939.

From 1941 Bachmann became a private lecturer at University of Königsberg and from 1943 at the Humboldt University of Berlin.

On 1 March 1949, he was promoted to full professor (Ordentlicher Professor) at the University of Kiel. He became known for his work on geometry, especially for his axiomatic justification of elementary geometry with mirroring operations, previously begun by Johannes Hjelmslev and others.

After the war, Bachmann worked with the mathematician Karl-Heinrich Weise to rebuild the mathematics department at the University of Kiel.
From 1960 Bachman was editor of the series titled, Grundzüge der Mathematik für Lehrer an Gymnasien sowie für Mathematiker in Industrie und Wirtschaft (Basic features of mathematics for teachers at grammar schools as well as for mathematicians in industry and business).

In 1962–1963, Bachmann was elected Dean of the mathematics department of the Faculty of Philosophy of Kiel University.

Bachmann retired on 31 March 1977.

Bibliography
The following are articles, written or co-authored by Bachmann.
 
 
 
 
 
 

The following is books or monographs written by Bachmann
 
>

Literature

References

1909 births
1982 deaths
People from Wernigerode
20th-century German mathematicians
Group theorists